TSS St Julien was a passenger vessel built for the Great Western Railway in 1925.

History

TSS St Julien was built by John Brown and Company as one of a pair of vessels, with TSS St Helier for the Weymouth to the Channel Islands service. She arrived in Weymouth from the Clyde on 4 May 1925.

The captain, Charles Hamon Langdon, was found dead in his cabin during a voyage from the Channel Islands to Weymouth in September 1927.

She had two funnels but one was a dummy and this was removed in 1928.

On 1 October 1937 she went to the assistance of the French steamer Briseis which had struck the rocks near Grand Roccque, Guernsey.

When war broke out in 1939 she was put to use ferrying troops but very quickly converted into a hospital ship. She took part in the evacuation of British troops from Dunkirk and Cherbourg in 1940. She spent the remainder of the war as a hospital ship, including a period operating in the Mediterranean and supporting the D Day landings. She was damaged by a mine on 7 June 1944 but repaired and resumed service on 24 June 1944.

Afterwards she returned to Weymouth for further railway service which lasted until 27 September 1960. She was sent to Van Heyghen Freres, Ghent in March 1961 for scrapping.

References

1925 ships
Passenger ships of the United Kingdom
Steamships of the United Kingdom
Ships built on the River Clyde
Ships of the Great Western Railway